Ecyrus hirtipes is a species of beetle in the family Cerambycidae. It was described by Charles Joseph Gahan in 1895. It is known from Guadeloupe, Barbados, Martinique, Cuba, Saint Vincent and the Grenadines, the Dominican Republic, Bahamas, Grenada, Haiti, and Puerto Rico. It feeds on Inga ingoides.

References

Pogonocherini
Beetles described in 1895